John Desmond Beauchamp Doran  (6 April 1913 – 9 September 1946) was a British Army Intelligence Officer who started his career in intelligence in the Secret Intelligence Service. He spent most of his active service career in the Middle East during the Second World War and the troubles that followed in the British Mandatory Palestine. Doran's family were a long established military family with roots in County Wexford, Ireland. His father Walter Robert Butler Doran was a highly decorated British Army Officer, as were his uncles and grandfather.

He is recorded as being an officer in the Secret Intelligence Service before transferring to the army.

He was commissioned in the Intelligence Corps as a Lieutenant on 12 February 1943; his service number was 274197. He is recorded as having been on the staff of Security Intelligence Middle East (SIME) based in Cairo. His preferred titling was Desmond Doran whilst on government service.

At the end of the war Doran was transferred from Cairo to British Mandatory Palestine and became the Area Security Officer for Jaffa/Tel Aviv. His living quarters and office were located above another government office located at the municipal boundary between Jewish Tel Aviv and the Arab port of Jaffa.

He died of wounds received in a terrorist attack on his quarters on 9 September 1946. He was buried at the Ramleh War Cemetery now located in Israel. Major Doran had been specifically targeted by the Lehi because he was a threat to the organistation. Doran's Romanian-born wife Sanda and other military personnel Arab and British were involved in the attack. Major Doran's obituary notice indicates that Sanda Doran did survive the injuries received in the attack.

References

1913 births
1946 deaths
Secret Intelligence Service personnel
British Army personnel of World War II
Intelligence Corps officers
Burials at Ramleh Commonwealth War Graves Commission Cemetery
British military personnel killed in action
People from Marylebone
Military personnel from London
British military personnel of the Palestine Emergency
Terrorism deaths in Israel